Pornsawan Porpramook ( born in Ta Phraya District, Prachinburi Province (presently: in Sa Kaeo Province) is a Thai professional boxer in the minimumweight division and is a former WBA minimumweight champion. Porpramook has been also rated in the top ten by Ring Magazine at minimumweight until as of October 2011. Porpramook lost the title in his first defence against Japan's Akira Yaegashi via a tenth round technical knockout at the Korakuen Hall in Tokyo on October 24, 2011.  Porpramook fought again for the WBA minumumweight world title on December 31, 2012 against Ryo Miyazaki, where he lost by split decision.

Titles and accomplishments

Muay thai
Lumpinee Stadium 
 1999 Lumpinee Stadium 105 lbs Champion

Professional Boxing Association of Thailand (PAT) 
 2000 Thailand 108 lbs Champion

Boxing
Pan Asian Boxing Association
 2001 PABA Super Minimumweight Champion (16 defenses)
 2013 interim PABA Super Light-flyweight Champion

World Boxing Council
 2008 interim WBC Asian Boxing Council Minimumweight Champion 

World Boxing Association
 2011 WBA World Minimumweight Champion

Muay Thai record

|-  style="background:#cfc;"
| 2009-07-31|| Win||align=left| Saenkeng Thor Thongchai || Saengsawang, Lumpinee Stadium || Bangkok, Thailand || Decision || 5 || 3:00

|-  style="background:#fbb;"
| 2009-06-19|| Loss ||align=left| Fahrungruang Sor.Poolsawat || Petchpiya, Lumpinee Stadium || Bangkok, Thailand || Decision || 5 || 3:00

|-  style="background:#cfc;"
| 2009-05-22|| Win||align=left| Wanchai Sor.Kittisak || Por.Pramuk, Lumpinee Stadium || Bangkok, Thailand || KO || 1 || 0:53

|-  style="background:#;"
| 2001-08-07|| ||align=left| Mafaonglek Chor.Na Phatthalung || Por.Pramook, Lumpinee Stadium || Bangkok, Thailand || ||  || 

|-  bgcolor="#cfc"
| 2001-06-30 || Win||align=left| Daoprasuk Sit Pafa || Lumpinee Stadium || Bangkok, Thailand || Decision  || 5 || 3:00

|-  style="background:#cfc;"
| 2001-05-29|| Win||align=left| Samson Lukjaopormahesak ||  || Bangkok, Thailand || KO || 2 || 

|-  bgcolor="#cfc"
| 2001-02-23 || Win||align=left| Saensuk Por Kaewsen || Por.Pramook, Lumpinee Stadium || Bangkok, Thailand || Decision  || 5 || 3:00

|-  bgcolor="#cfc"
| 2000-12-08 || Win||align=left| Samson Lukjaopormahesak || Lumpinee Stadium || Bangkok, Thailand || Decision  || 5 || 3:00
|-
! style=background:white colspan=9 |

|-  bgcolor="#cfc"
| 2000-10-10 || Win||align=left| Fahsuchon Sit-O || Lumpinee Stadium || Bangkok, Thailand || Decision  || 5 || 3:00

|-  style="background:#fbb;"
| 2000-06-06|| Loss||align=left| Petchtapi Por Singtai || Fairtex, Lumpinee Stadium || Bangkok, Thailand || Decision || 5 || 3:00

|-  style="background:#;"
| 2000-03-17|| ||align=left| Yodradab Daopaedriew || Por.Pramook, Lumpinee Stadium || Bangkok, Thailand || ||  || 

|-  style="background:#c5d2ea;"
| 2000-02-01|| Draw ||align=left| Yodradab Daopaedriew || Por.Pramook, Lumpinee Stadium || Bangkok, Thailand || Decision || 5 || 3:00

|-  style="background:#fbb;"
| 2000-01-13|| Loss ||align=left| Samson Lukjaopormahesak || Rajadamnern Stadium || Bangkok, Thailand || Decision || 5 || 3:00

|-  bgcolor="#cfc"
| 1999-11-08 || Win||align=left| Klairung Sor.Sasiprapagym || Rajadamnern Stadium || Bangkok, Thailand || Decision  || 5 || 3:00

|-  bgcolor="#cfc"
| 1999-10-02 || Win||align=left| Rungrit Sitchamong || Lumpinee Stadium || Bangkok, Thailand || Decision  || 5 || 3:00
|-
! style=background:white colspan=9 |

|-  bgcolor="#cfc"
| 1999-08-28 || Win||align=left| Rungrit Sitchamong || Rajadamnern Stadium || Bangkok, Thailand || Decision  || 5 || 3:00

|-  bgcolor="#cfc"
| 1999-06-29 || Win||align=left| Ekachai Chaibadan || Lumpinee Stadium || Bangkok, Thailand || Decision  || 5 || 3:00

|-  bgcolor="#fbb"
| 1999- || Loss||align=left| Paruhatnoi Sor.Charoensuk || Lumpinee Stadium || Bangkok, Thailand || Decision  || 5 || 3:00

|-  bgcolor="#cfc"
| 1998-01-16 || Win||align=left| Nongbee Kiatyongyut || Rajadamnern Stadium || Bangkok, Thailand || Decision  || 5 || 3:00
|-
| colspan=9 | Legend:

See also
List of Mini-flyweight boxing champions

References

External links

1978 births
Living people
Mini-flyweight boxers
Light-flyweight boxers
World mini-flyweight boxing champions
World Boxing Association champions
Pornsawan Porpramook
Pornsawan Porpramook